"Let There Be Love" is a song by English singer Melanie C from her fifth studio album The Sea. It is an English-language cover of the German song "" by Rosenstolz. Melanie C performed the song on The Sea – Live tour.

Background
"Let There Be Love" is one of many ballads Melanie C has released in the German-speaking countries.

Music video
The music video, filmed in Brighton, features Melanie on a street along the beach (a homage to her album The Sea, and also where the album was recorded). The video features different couples kissing and cuddling with each other, at various different places near the beach and Brighton Pier. As Melanie sings, the names of couples appear to be written onto a wall she is singing in front of.

B-side
The B-side "Stronger" was released as part of the digital bundle and limited edition CD release of "Weak" and "Let There Be Love". Melanie co-wrote 'Stronger' with Shelly Poole and Norwegian song writing and production duo Jim & Jack.

Formats and track listings
These are the formats and track listings of major single releases of "Let There Be Love".

 Digital download and Limited CD single
 "Let There Be Love"
 "Stronger"

Release history

References

2011 songs
2011 singles
Melanie C songs
Songs written by Peter Plate
Songs written by Ulf Leo Sommer